is a Japanese footballer currently playing as a forward for Tegevajaro Miyazaki.

Club career
While studying at the Osaka University of Health and Sport Sciences, Kamiyama was announced as a Tegevajaro Miyazaki player ahead of the 2022 season.

Career statistics

Club
.

Notes

References

1999 births
Living people
Association football people from Tokyo
Osaka University of Health and Sport Sciences alumni
Japanese footballers
Association football forwards
J3 League players
Tegevajaro Miyazaki players